WMQZ (104.1 FM) is a radio station broadcasting an active rock format. Licensed to Colchester, Illinois, United States, the station serves Macomb, and vicinity. The station is currently owned by Fletcher Ford, through licensee Virden Broadcasting Corp.

On October 31, 2019, WMQZ dropped its oldies format as Rewind 104.1 and flipped to active rock as Woof Rock 104.

Previous Logos

References

External links

MQZ
Active rock radio stations in the United States